The Sixth District Councils of Hong Kong is the current meeting of the local councils of the Hong Kong Special Administrative Region Government. The membership of the council is based on the 2019 election. The term of the session is from 1 January 2020 to 31 December 2023. The pro-democracy camp in conjunction with the localist groups achieved its biggest landslide victory in the history of Hong Kong, gaining absolute majority in votes and electoral seats in all of the 18 District Councils. The election was widely viewed as a de facto referendum on the 2019–20 Hong Kong protests.

Overview

18 District Councils Liaison 
In February 2020, chairpersons and vice-chairpersons of 17 District Councils of which pro-democracy camp held the majority, along with a councilor representative from the remaining Islands District Council formed the "18 District Councils Liaison" to exchange views on city-wide and local issues. The unofficial Liaison led by pro-democracy politicians was the first all-District Council group in Hong Kong. Having 388 local councillors as members, the Liaison had made various statements including the objection to the Beijing-imposed National Security Law.

18 District Councils Liaison was disbanded on 15 May 2021, saying District Councils have been cooperating on livelihood agenda, and so the Liaison had finished its goal.

Seat vacancies 
Unprecedented large number of District Councillors resigned or disqualified amid fast-changing political landscape in Hong Kong after protests. At least 290 out of 479 seats are now vacant, all were used to be held by pro-democracy and allied localism politicians.

Arrest of primaries participants 

53 participants of 2020 Hong Kong pro-democracy primaries for the now-delayed Legislative Council election were arrested in January 2021. 47 of the arrested were charged under National Security Law in February, including 23 District Councillors, of which only 10 were granted bail as of September 2021. Those 13 councillors resigned between March and July 2021 due to inability to continue district work after remanded in custody, while the 10 freed from custody were either disqualified or had resigned.

Oath of office controversy 

The Hong Kong Government tabled a bill to require all District Councillors to take oath of office in 2021 as the Chinese Government stressed the importance of patriotism for public officers. District Councillors deemed unpatriotic, including breaching the oath, or failing to uphold the Basic Law or to pledge allegiance to Hong Kong Government, could result in disqualification of office.

While explaining the bill in the parliament, Erick Tsang, Secretary for Constitutional and Mainland Affairs, named Fergus Leung, Tat Cheng, Lester Shum and Tiffany Yuen as the four councillors whom will be disqualified immediately after the bill was gazetted as their nominations in 2020 legislative election were invalid. As Leung and Cheng resigned before the bill came into force, only two were unseated by the authorities in accordance with the new law.

At least 10 members of District Councils resigned to protest against the new law although the details of the oath-taking ceremonies were yet to announce.

In early July 2021, local media started to report, citing unnamed sources, that the government will not allow around 230 councillors to take oath of office in the coming month, resulting in their disqualification or even to recover the remuneration since their inauguration which worth around a million dollars. The reports triggered a mass resignation of councilors to avoid the consequences of heavy financial burdens, leading to a total of at least 217 empty seats in District Councils.

On 10 September, District Councillors representing constituencies on Hong Kong Island took the oath of office. Peter Choi Chi-keung from the Eastern District declined to take oath on that day, and was immediately required to vacate his seat. An addition of 7 Councillors were also disqualified days later after their oath were invalidated, likely to be linked to their involvement in the pro-democracy primaries. The next round of oath-taking for Kowloon councillors was held on 24 September, 10 members' oath were invalidated, hence, along with Lee Man-ho who declined to take oath, were disqualified. Third round and fourth round for New Territories East and West was on 4 October and 8 October respectively, 16 councillors were disqualified.

Other disqualifications 
According to District Councils Ordinance, any District Councillor convicted "of an offence for which the person has been sentenced to imprisonment, whether suspended or not, for a term exceeding 3 months without the option of a fine" would be disqualified. As a result, Leung Yiu-chung and Sin Chung-kai were unseated due to illegal assembly during the citywide protests, while Leung Kam-wai for his participation in Tiananmen vigil.

Ted Hui, Lee Ka-wai, Wong Hoi-ying were disqualified from holding office for the remainder of term of office after failed to attend meetings of the District Council for 4 consecutive months without obtaining the consent of the council before the end of that period. Hui, which faced at least 9 charges, has been in exile since December 2020. Lee reportedly travelled to Britain in March 2021 and only to announce the news four months later but insisted on not resigning. Wong on 31 December 2021 said she had left Hong Kong for her kids.

Hung Chun-hin and Lee Hin-long were determined by court to be not duly elected after pro-Beijing defeated councillors won the election petitions.

Young Ka-on was also unseated after court ruling, becoming the first pro-Beijing councillor leaving the District Council since the 2019 local election.

Other resignations 
5 councilors resigned in wake of political changes since late 2020, including the imposition of National Security Law and electoral reform, saying the duties of local councils had been significantly limited. 15 councilors resigned for health, family or other personal reasons, which their resignation could also be related to the political environment in the aftermath of government's actions.

Leadership

List of members

Hong Kong Island

Central and Western

Wan Chai

Eastern

Southern

Kowloon

Yau Tsim Mong

Sham Shui Po

Kowloon City

Wong Tai Sin

Kwun Tong

New Territories

Tsuen Wan

Tuen Mun

Yuen Long

North

Tai Po

Sai Kung

Sha Tin

Kwai Tsing

Islands

See also
6th Legislative Council of Hong Kong

References

External links 
District Council official website

District Councils of Hong Kong